A repugnant market is an area of commerce that is considered by society to be outside of the range of market transactions and that bringing this area into the realm of a market would be inherently immoral or uncaring.  For example, many people consider a market in human organs to be a repugnant market or the ability to bet on terrorist acts in prediction market to be repugnant.  Others consider the lack of such markets to be even more immoral and uncaring, as trade bans (e.g. in organ transplants and terrorism information) can create avoidable human suffering.

Nobel Laureate Alvin Roth (2007) "introduced in the economics literature the concept of “repugnance” for a transaction as the aversion toward other individuals engaging in it, even if the parties directly involved benefit from that trade (i.e. “There are some things no one should be allowed to do”). Repugnance considerations have important consequences on the types of markets and transactions that we observe and, as such, they impose a challenge for policy and market design."

Examples

The repugnance of markets varies according to time, culture, and economic development, among other factors.  Slavery is a market currently considered repugnant while for most of recorded history before circa 1000 AD it was considered acceptable, and was still considered acceptable against certain people groups until circa 1800 AD.  Examples of markets considered repugnant at one time or place include:
Pregnancy/early childhood
 Abortion
 Adoption
 Egg donation for research purposes
 Fetal organs and aborted fetal tissue
 Surrogacy, legal in India and most states in the U.S. (but banned in France and Japan)
 Drugs & food
 Illegal drug trade
 Horse meat, whale meat, dog meats (e.g. in California), cat meat, beef in India, and the meat of endangered animals.
 Labour
 Child labor
 Slavery or indentured servitude
Social status/political power
 Citizenship and/or immigration (Investor visas such as the U.S. E-2 visa are exceptions.  Several notable economists have proposed selling citizenship)
 Education
 Lobbying 
 Military mercenaries
 Political corruption activities, such as bribery and influence peddling
 Vote buying
Money/Speculation
 Currency speculation 
 Gambling
 Predatory lending, especially mortgage lending 
 Pyramid schemes and multi-level marketing
 Selling short 
 Ticket touting in sports events and concerts 
 Usury (Has never been allowed by Islam and historically banned in Christian countries)

Economic corruption/media power
 Payola 
 Product placement in some European countries
 Radio spectrum
Sex
 Pornography (Repugnant in some countries/cultures, especially paraphiliac pornography)
 Prostitution
 Virginity
Other
 Certain prediction markets (e.g. 'terrorism futures market') 
 Health Care
 Organ trade and organ donation from a live donor (Turkey and the Philippines are notable exceptions}
 Cadavers
 Life insurance 
 Real estate in Cuba
 Real estate broker/agent profession or flipping real estate 
 Metered parking
 Contract Killing
 Simony

See also
Prohibitionism
Repugnancy costs
Taboo
Yuck factor

References

External links
Transcript of BBC broadcast on repugnant markets
Google video on Market Failure and Market Design

Business ethics